Charles Stagg Rogers (January 15, 1902 – June 26, 1986) was an American football player and coach.  He played college football at the University of Pennsylvania and was selected to the 1926 College Football All-America Team. After graduation, he played in the National Football League (NFL) for the Frankford Yellow Jackets from 1927 to 1929. He served the team as a player-coach during their 1927 season. Rogers served as the head football coach at the University of Delaware from 1931 to 1933, comping a record of 12–9–4.

Head coaching record

College

References

External links
 

1902 births
1986 deaths
American football halfbacks
Delaware Fightin' Blue Hens football coaches
Frankford Yellow Jackets coaches
Frankford Yellow Jackets players
Penn Quakers football players
Sportspeople from Camden, New Jersey
Coaches of American football from New Jersey
Players of American football from Camden, New Jersey